Rafael Domínguez (born 11 November 1941) is a Dominican Republic sprinter. He competed in the men's 4 × 100 metres relay at the 1968 Summer Olympics.

References

External links
 

1941 births
Living people
Athletes (track and field) at the 1968 Summer Olympics
Dominican Republic male sprinters
Olympic athletes of the Dominican Republic
Place of birth missing (living people)
20th-century Dominican Republic people